The Hernando Desoto Bridge is a bridge carrying U.S. Highway 41 (US 41) and US 301 over the Manatee River between Palmetto and Bradenton, Florida. It is one of two bridges connecting Bradenton and Palmetto.

History
The Desoto Bridge was built in 1957 in an effort to realign US 41 and US 301 through Bradenton and Palmetto. Prior to 1957, those routes crossed the Manatee River a short distance downstream on the original Green Bridge (part of which has become a fishing pier after the Green Bridge was replaced in 1986).

Future
Florida Department of Transportation (FDOT) is evaluating several options on replacing the bridge to increase its traffic capacity. More than one-third of vehicles crossing the bridge is pass-through traffic, drivers who do not have the cities of Bradenton or Palmetto as a point of origin or destination.

See also

References

Road bridges in Florida
Bridges completed in 1957
Concrete bridges in the United States
Transportation buildings and structures in Manatee County, Florida
U.S. Route 41
U.S. Route 301
Bridges of the United States Numbered Highway System

Bridges over the Manatee River